Theta Kappa Nu Fraternity was founded in 1924 by delegates from 11 local fraternities.

History
Theta Kappa Nu  Fraternity was founded on  when delegates from 11 local fraternities from nine different states united to form the new fraternity. The organizing meeting took place in Springfield, Missouri. Theta Kappa Nu had, over its first decade, become the fastest-growing fraternity until that time, chartering 40 chapters with almost 2,500 initiates by the close of 1926.

Most of Theta Kappa Nu’s chapters were established at small, private colleges as local fraternities. The fraternity placed great emphasis on academics, offering graduate scholarships throughout its history, even during dire financial crises.

A change of direction
The Great Depression hit small colleges, and Theta Kappa Nu very hard. Expansion nearly ceased and chapters began closing in the early 1930s. By the end of the decade, fraternity leaders realized that a merger with another fraternity was necessary to continue solvency.

Merger with Lambda Chi Alpha

Throughout its lifetime, leaders of Theta Kappa Nu had established numerous friendships with peers within Lambda Chi Alpha, whose expansion program had preferred chapters at larger institutions. Initial informal talks quickly led to a formal merger committee. In 1939, Lambda Chi Alpha merged with the Theta Kappa Nu in what was regarded as the largest fraternity merger to date. The ceremony was held in Birmingham, Alabama, at Howard College (now Samford) at the home of the oldest chapter among the original founding chapters of Theta Kappa Nu, Alabama Alpha chapter, where the documents were signed.

The union of Lambda Chi Alpha and Theta Kappa Nu resulted in 105 active chapters for the combined fraternity and over 27,000 initiates. Theta Kappa Nu’s heritage entered that of the united fraternity with additions to the coat of arms, the white tudor rose as the fraternity flower, a new pledge pin (now the associate member pin) design, a new pledge ceremony (Now the associate member) which is a condensed version of Theta Kappa Nu’s ritual, and the Latin open motto Vir Quisque Vir, or "Every man a man". It also brought an infusion of leadership to Lambda Chi Alpha that helped steer the united fraternity through the end of the Depression Era and World War II.

Chapters 
The following chapter list is taken from Vir Quisque Vir (1936/37), the pledge manual of Theta Kappa Nu. It is augmented with the chapter designation assigned by Lambda Chi Alpha at the time of the union in 1939. Where chapters of both fraternities had been chartered at a single institution, the Lambda Chi Alpha chapter designation was retained by the merged chapter and the potential Theta- or Kappa- series designation (indicating origin as a Theta Kappa Nu chapter) was reserved (unused) to honor the origin of the former chapter. Added to the 1937 list is the Mississippi State chapter, chartered at the last grand chapter one day before the merger with Lambda Chi Alpha took effect.

Chapters that were active at the time of the merger indicated in bold, inactive chapters, or those few that did not participate in the merger, are indicated by italics.

[**] - some inactive dates taken from a July 1939 short special edition of The Theta News.

References

External links
ΘΚΝ History
Union of ΘΚΝ and ΛΧΑ
Theta Kappa Nu's Fifth Grand Chapter

1924 establishments in Missouri
Lambda Chi Alpha
Student societies in the United States
1939 disestablishments in Alabama
Student organizations established in 1924
Defunct former members of the North American Interfraternity Conference